Six ships of the Royal Navy have borne the name HMS Suffolk, after the county of Suffolk:

  was a 70-gun third rate launched in 1680, rebuilt in 1699, 1718 and 1739, and broken up in 1765.
  was a 30-gun storeship purchased in 1694 and sold in 1713.
  was a 74-gun third rate launched in 1765 and sold in 1803.
 HMS Suffolk was a prison ship launched in 1775 as the 74-gun third rate . She became a prison ship in 1797, was renamed HMS Suffolk in 1805, and was sold in 1816.
  was a  armoured cruiser launched in 1903 and sold in 1920.
  was a  heavy cruiser launched in 1926 and sold for breaking up in 1948.

See also
A fictional HMS Suffolk, played by the Type 23 frigate , appeared in the ITV drama Making Waves

Royal Navy ship names